Liquor is the sixth album by American indie rock band Lydia. The album was released on July 13, 2018, through Weekday Records/Sony Music Entertainment. The first single, "Goodside," was released on March 9, 2018.

History
On March 8, 2018, Lydia announced the release date, track listing, cover art, and first single from Liquor, their sixth LP. "Goodside" was made available for purchase on March 9, 2018.

Critical reception
Sputnikmusic wrote that "for the first time ... it appears that Lydia has released an album that is precisely average."

Track listing

Charts

References

2018 albums
Lydia (band) albums